Red wall or Redwall may refer to:

Literature
 Redwall, a series of children's fantasy novels by Brian Jacques
 Redwall (novel), the first novel in this series
 Redwall (TV series), a 1999 animated series based on the novel series
 Redwall: The Movie, a direct-to-video movie recompilation of season 1 of the TV series, based on the first novel "Redwall"
 Redwall: The Adventure Game, a videogame adventure game series based on the novel series
 The Red Wall, a memoir by the Canadian policewoman Jane Hall

Politics
 Red wall (British politics), traditionally Labour-voting areas in the UK, particularly in parts of the Midlands, North of England and Wales
 "Red wall" (US politics), traditionally Republican-voting areas in the US Midwest and South

Translated term
 Muralla Roja, an apartment complex in Calpe, Spain
 Rote Wand, a mountain in Austria
 Rotwand (disambiguation), several mountains in the Alps, Europe
 Battle of Monastir (1917), World War I battle, in Bulgarian called 

Other uses
The Red Wall, the nickname given to supporters of the Wales National Football Team
 Redwall Limestone or Redwall Formation, rock layer that forms prominent, red-stained cliffs in the Grand Canyon, Arizona
 Redwalls, The Homestead, Sandiway, Cheshire, England, UK; a listed building on the Homestead estate
 Redwall Dam, Marble Canyon, Colorado River, Arizona, USA; a proposed impoundment dam
 Red Wall Gang, a former criminal gang in Dublin, Ireland
 The Redwalls, a U.S. rock band

See also

 
 
 
 
 
 Wall (disambiguation)
 Red (disambiguation)